Tom Swift is the name of the central fictional character in six series of juvenile science fiction and adventure novels. Hence:

Tom Swift Jr., character in a series of 33 adventure novels
Tom Swift III, unofficial name of the third series to feature Tom Swift
Tom Swift IV, unofficial name of the fourth series to feature Tom Swift
Tom Swifty, a phrase in which a quoted sentence is linked by a pun to the manner in which it's attributed - e.g., "'It's freezing,' Tom muttered icily."
Tom Swift (TV series), which ran for one season in 2022.

Tom Swift may also refer to:
Tom Swift (footballer) (born 1990), Australian rules footballer
Tom Swift (politician) (born 1944), American politician in Pennsylvania

Swift, Tom